Carrier Strike Group 2 (CSG-2 or COMCARSTRKGRU 2) is a U.S. Navy carrier strike group, tracing its history originally to 1931. The aircraft carrier  is the strike group's current flagship.

The group traces its history to the creation of Carrier Division 2 on 1 April 1931. The group took its current form on 1 October 2004. On 29 July 2010, Rear Admiral Nora W. Tyson assumed command of the group, becoming the first woman to command a U.S. Navy carrier task group.  The group's 2011 Mediterranean deployment marked the maiden deployment for the carrier USS George H.W. Bush and the guided-missile destroyer . The group's units were the first U.S. naval forces to participate in Operation Inherent Resolve, the 2014 U.S.-led multi-lateral air campaign against the Islamic State group.

Historical background
On 1 April 1931, Rear Admiral Joseph M. Reeves took command of Carrier Division 2 (CarDiv 2), becoming the first carrier division commander in the U.S. Navy. Reeves was also designated as Commander Aircraft U.S. Fleet. Under Reeves' leadership, both carriers had previously distinguished themselves in two major naval exercises, the 1929 Fleet Problem IX and the 1930 Fleet Problem X, demonstrating the potential of aircraft carriers and their embarked air groups in naval offensive operations. Aircraft carriers from Carrier Division 2 became the first to embark U.S. Marine Corps aviation units when, on 2 November 1931, squadron VS-14M joined the Saratoga and squadron VS-15M joined the Lexington.

In February 1939, Carrier Division Two, now consisting of Yorktown and Enterprise, participated in the war game Fleet Problem XX. The scenario for the exercise called for one fleet to control the sea lanes in the Caribbean against the incursion of a foreign European power while maintaining sufficient naval strength to protect vital American interests in the Pacific. In December 1941, on the eve of the United States' entry into the Second World War, Carrier Division Two was under the command of Vice Admiral William Halsey Jr., who was also the Commander Aircraft Battle Force in the Pacific Ocean.

During the Second World War, aircraft carriers assigned to Carrier Division Two participated in the Doolittle Raid, the Battle of Midway, the Battle of the Santa Cruz Islands, Operation Hailstone, the Battle of the Philippine Sea, and the Battle of Leyte Gulf, as well as the Solomon Islands campaign, the Gilbert and Marshall Islands campaign, the Hollandia and Western New Guinea campaign, the Philippines Campaign, the Mariana and Palau Islands campaign, the Iwo Jima campaign, and the Okinawan campaign, as part of the Navy's Fast Carrier Task Force. Rear Admiral Frederick C. Sherman commanded the division in 1943 while it was operating with the Fast Carrier Task Force.

Ranger sailed as the flagship of Rear Admiral H. H. Caldwell, Commander, Carrier Division 2, from Hawaii to join the Seventh Fleet in February 1959. Air operations off Okinawa were followed by maneuvers with naval units from U.S. Naval Base Subic Bay. A special weapons warfare exercise and a patrol along the southern seaboard of Japan followed. During this deployment, Ranger launched more than 7,000 sorties.

After the war, division aircraft carriers were involved in the Cuban Missile Crisis and the Vietnam War.  flew the flag of Commander Carrier Division 2 in 1963. Rear Admiral Bernard M. Strean, as division commander, led Enterprise, Long Beach, and Bainbridge around the world in Operation Sea Orbit from July to October 1964. 'Sea Orbit' was a successful test of the first all-nuclear-powered task force. On 25 September 1965, Rear Admiral J. O. Cobb broke his flag as Commander, Carrier Division 2, aboard . The division was re-designated as Commander Carrier Group 2 (ComCarGru 2) in 1973.

In 1986, while commanding Carrier Group Two, Rear Admiral Jerry C. Breast commanded the  carrier battle group and Task Group 60.1 of the U.S. Sixth Fleet during a series of naval maneuvers code-named Attain Document.  These naval maneuvers were intended to assert the freedom of navigation in the Gulf of Sidra as well as to challenge the territorial claims of Libya to that body of water.  Subsequently, the Coral Sea carrier battle group and the rest of Task Force 60 carried out Operation El Dorado Canyon, a series of punitive air-strikes against Libya in retaliations to the 1986 Berlin discotheque bombing.

The battle group deployed for Operation Desert Storm only five days after notification, even though she had dispersed her air wing throughout the continental United States for training and just off-loaded stores and material in preparation for a routine yard period. Rear Admiral Riley Mixson, Commander, Carrier Group Two, acted as Commander, Battle Force Yankee of Naval Forces Central Command during the war. Battle Force Yankee included Saratoga and probably John F. Kennedy, and operated in the Red Sea.

In the middle of 1992, the U.S. Navy instituted a concept which mandated greater task group integration of naval air and surface warfare assets into a more permanent carrier battle group structure. Instead of routinely changing the cruisers, destroyers, and frigates assigned to each carrier battle group, there was an attempt made to affiliate certain escorts more permanently with the carriers they escorted. Each of the Navy's 12 existing carrier battle groups was planned to consist of an aircraft carrier; an embarked carrier air wing; cruiser, destroyer, and frigate units; and two nuclear-powered attack submarines. For details regarding this re-alignments as it pertained to Carrier Group Two, see the chart below.

Carrier Group Two, late 1992

 
During its Mediterranean deployments, the Kennedy battle group flew large numbers of Operation Deny Flight no-fly zone missions over Bosnia-Herzegovina. The battle group also saw service with the U.S. Fifth Fleet in support Operation Southern Watch, the enforcement of a no-fly zone over southern Iraq. Commander Carrier Group Two also served as Commander Joint Task Force 120 during Operation Uphold Democracy, the 1994–1995 intervention designed to remove the military regime in Haiti installed by the 1991 Haitian coup d'état. In addition,  was intended to join the group in 1996–97. In September 1995,  joined Carrier Group Two. Hue City was transferred from Carrier Group 2 to the Western Hemisphere Group on 1 August 1998.

The group deployed in 2000–01 led by Harry S. Truman (CVN-75).

 was reassigned to the group effective 1 February 2004, and the carrier underwent its Docked Planned Incremental Availability overhaul at the Newport Naval Yard in Virginia between 10 August to 10 December 2004.

Command structure
Commander Carrier Strike Group 2 (COMCARSTRKGRU 2 or CCSG 2) is responsible for unit-level training, integrated training, and material readiness for the group's ships and aviation squadrons.  When not deployed, the strike group is part of the U.S. Fleet Forces Command, and its commander reports to Commander, U.S. SECOND Fleet.  When deployed overseas, the group comes under command of the numbered fleet (Third, Fourth, Fifth, Sixth, or Seventh) in whose area it is operating, and will have a task force or task group designator, for example, Task Group 50 in the Fifth Fleet area.

Group commanders since 2004 have included:

Operational history
On 1 October 2004, Carrier Group 2 was re-designated as Carrier Strike Group 2.  Theodore Roosevelt underwent sea trials 11–15 December 2004, and the carrier was officially delivered back to the Navy on 17 December 2004. Joint Task Force Exercise 05-2 (JTFEX 05-2, or Operation Brewing Storm 2005) was held between 14–22 July 2005. It included Carrier Strike Group 2, Carrier Strike Group Ten, the Spanish frigate Álvaro de Bazán, and the Peruvian submarine Antofagasta. The group received its Combat Operations Efficiency certification following the completion of its Composite Training Unit Exercise on 17 July 2005.

2005–2006 deployment
The strike group departed from Norfolk on 1 September 2005 under the command of Rear Admiral James A. Winnefeld. On 6 October 2005, the group began air operations over Iraq, with fighter squadrons VF-213 and VF-31, along with the strike fighter squadrons VFA-87 and VFA-15, attacking insurgent targets. Electronic Attack Squadron 141 (VAQ-141) operated from Al Asad, Iraq, from 24 September to 6 October 2005, flying 37 combat sorties.  VAW-124, VS-24, and HS-3 aircraft flew maritime security missions. Throughout the second week of November aircraft supported Operation Steel Curtain flying five consecutive days of close air support for troops in Iraq. The deployment was the final one for the F-14 Tomcat. It was also the final deployment of the Lockheed S-3 Viking ASW aircraft of squadron VS-24. The group transited the Suez Canal on 15 February 2006. It returned to Norfolk on 11 March 2006.
2005–2006 deployment force composition

2005–2006 deployment exercises and port visits

Operation Bold Step 2006

Codenamed Operation Bold Step, Joint Task Force Exercise 06-2 (JTFEX 06-2) was held off the U.S. eastern coast between 21–31 July 2006 under the overall command of Vice Admiral Mark P. Fitzgerald, the commander of the U.S. Second Fleet. Carrier Strike Group 2, Carrier Strike Group 8, and the  Expeditionary Strike Group were the major U.S. naval formations participating in Operation Bold Step which served as a major pre-deployment training exercise.  Other allied naval units that participated in Operation Bold Step included the French nuclear-powered submarine Émeraude and the Colombian diesel-electric submarine Tayrona.

2008–2009 deployment
On 8 September 2008, the strike group departed for a regularly scheduled deployment under the command of Rear Admiral Frank Craig Pandolfe. During its 2008 deployment, group aircraft flew more than 3,100 sorties into Afghanistan and dropped  of ordnance while providing vital close air support to coalition forces operating as part of the International Security Assistance Force (ISAF) in Afghanistan. On 9 October 2008, Theodore Roosevelt and the guided missile cruiser  participated in a one-day theater security cooperation exercise with three South African warships and one French Navy warship in the Indian Ocean following a 3-day port visit to Cape Town, the first by a U.S. aircraft carrier since 1967.

Between 5–14 March 2009, Theodore Roosevelt, the cruiser , and the Coast Guard cutter  participated in the international naval exercise Aman 2009 off the coast of Pakistan (pictured).  The exercise was sponsored by the Pakistani Navy, and it included surface exercises, air-defense training, explosive ordnance disposal (EOD) exercises, and participation in foreign officer exchanges.  Aman 2009  include participants from Australia, Bangladesh, China, France, Japan, Kuwait, Malaysia, Nigeria, Turkey, United States, and the United Kingdom.  Forty-six observers from naval forces of 27 countries monitored the exercise.
2008–2009 deployment force composition

2008–2009 Deployment exercises and port visits

2010 operations
In early 2010, more than 172 sailors from Carrier Strike Group Two took part in Operation Unified Response, the relief effort for earthquaked-ravaged Haiti.  Rear Admiral David M. Thomas and his command staff managed the movement of U.S. food, water, medical supplies and relief personnel to Haiti from Naval Station Guantanamo Bay, Cuba, and ships operating off the coast.  Thomas assumed command of Task Force 41, the U.S. Navy's sea-based element supporting Joint Task Force Haiti, on 1 February 2010, after 's Carrier Strike Group One departed the area.  The group staff alternated between being embarked aboard the amphibious assault ship  and living in tents outside of the U.S. Embassy in Port-au-Prince until late March. Most of the strike group staff returned to Naval Station Norfolk by 25 March 2010 after a 70-day tour of duty, with Rear Admiral Thomas returning on 1 April 2010.

2011 deployment

The group departed from Naval Station Mayport, Florida, for its Joint Task Force Exercise pre-deployment training exercise on 14 February 2011 prior to its deployment. The exercise was supported by personnel from Naval Striking and Support Forces NATO (STRIKFORNATO), with representatives from Canada, Denmark, Greece, Germany, France, Italy, the Netherlands, Spain, Turkey, the United Kingdom, and the United States.  The exercise focused on increasing allied interoperability during major combat operations. STRIKFORNATO's interest in JTFEX training cycle dates back to 2008, and this is the first time that STRIKFORNATO had participated as a component commander in a carrier strike group certification.

During its 2011 deployment, the group's aircraft completed nearly 12,000 sorties, made over 9,000 arrested landings, and logged almost 31,000 flight hours.  This included 2,216 combat sorties supporting U.S. forces in Iraq and Afghanistan.  Over 20 tons of ordnance were delivered in support of coalition ground forces, consisting of laser-guided bombs, GPS munitions, and 20-mm ammunition.  Carrier Air Wing Eight also participated in joint air operations with the Royal Jordanian Air Force and the Royal Saudi Air Force. After departing Djibouti on 1 July 2011,  conducted counter-piracy and maritime security operations as a unit of Combined Task Force 151 before paying a goodwill visit to Victoria, Seychelles on 18 August 2011. On 13 August 2011, while with Combined Task Force 150 operating in the Gulf of Aden, the destroyer Mitscher provided assistance to the Sri Lankan cargo vessel Al Habib which was experiencing engineering problems and running low on water.  Mitschers boarding party transported supplies to the Al Habib via rigid-hulled inflatable boat (pictured).

Also during this deployment, the group participated in: Exercise Saxon Warrior '11, an eight-day NATO military exercise in the Western Approaches.  Saxon Warrior '11 included naval forces from the United States, the United Kingdom, France, Germany, Sweden, Canada, and Spain under the overall direction of Flag Officer Sea Training. As part of Saxon Warrior '11, on 21 May 2011, the group's destroyers Truxtun and Mitscher joined the U.S. replenishment tanker  and the Spanish frigate Almirante Juan de Borbón in conducting a transit exercise, with the British destroyer  and frigate  acting as hostile forces during this exercise. Also, the guided-missile cruiser Gettysburg and the British destroyer  conducted joint air defense exercises (pictured).

On 8 December 2011, Gettysburg returned to Naval Station Mayport, Florida, and was greeted by Vice President Joe Biden. On 10 December 2011, George H.W. Bush, Anzio, Mitscher, Truxtun returned to Naval Station Norfolk, Virginia, completing the first overseas deployment for the Bush and Truxtun.

During 2011, the carrier George H.W. Bush and Carrier Air Wing Eight logged more than 250 days underway, 30,000 flight hours, and 14,000 sorties launched, which included 11,000 catapults shot, 15,000 aircraft recoveries, and no operational mishaps.  The Bush also received the Battenberg Cup, Battle Effectiveness Award, and the Flatley Award for 2011.

2011 deployment force composition

2011 deployment exercises and port visits

2012–2014 operations
On 25 July 2012, George H.W. Bush, began its four-month overhaul at Norfolk Naval Shipyard at Portsmouth, Virginia, which included scheduled short-term technical upgrades. Also undergoing maintenance during 2012 were the guided-missile destroyers Bainbridge, Mason, Bulkeley, Ross, and Barry, as well as the guided-missile frigate Kauffman.

On 1 December 2012, the George H.W. Bush completed its maintenance cycle and began sea trials on 3 December 2012.  After completing its sea trials on 4 December 2012, the Bush began its training and qualification cycle in preparation for the 2014 deployment of Carrier Strike Group Two.  This included the on-loading of munitions in anticipation of the upcoming overseas deployment of Carrier Strike Group Two.

The pre-deployment training cycle for Carrier Strike Group Two began with the successful completion of its Tailored Ship's Training Availability/Final Evaluation Problem (TSTA/FEP) training exercises on 23 August 2013.  TSTA integrated individual units of Carrier Strike Group Two into a single formation while FEP is a graded 48-hour training evolution that evaluated how effectively the strike group operated together.  These exercises were the first time that the George H.W. Bush and Carrier Air Wing Eight had operated together since 2011. On 20 November 2013, Carrier Strike Group Two began its 29-day Composite Training Unit Exercise (COMPTUEX).  This series of training exercises were designed to certify the carrier strike group's deployment readiness by testing its capability to react to real-world scenarios as an integrated naval combat formation. This included CVW-8 aircraft flying live bombing runs at the U.S. Navy's Pinecastle Bombing Range in Ocala National Forest, Florida between 18–18 December 2013.

At the start of 2014, Carrier Strike Group Two was in port and not underway. 
2012–2013 exercises and port visits

2014 deployment

On 15 February 2014, Carrier Strike Group Two began its 2014 Mediterranean and Indian Ocean deployment.  The carrier George H.W. Bush and the destroyer Truxtun departed Naval Station Norfolk, Virginia, to rendezvous with the cruiser Philippine Sea and destroyer Roosevelt that departed Naval Station Mayport, Florida, on 15 February 2014.  Also on that date, the destroyer Arleigh Burke departed Norfolk for an independent eight-month Ballistic Missile Defense deployment with the U.S. Fifth Fleet.

On 17 February 2014, Rear Admiral DeWolfe H. Miller, III relieved Rear Admiral John C. Aquilino as Commander, Carrier Strike Group Two.  A naval aviator, Miller had previously commanded the carrier George H.W. Bush while Aquilino's next assignment was operations director of the U.S. Pacific Fleet.

U.S. Sixth Fleet
On 24 February 2014, Carrier Strike Group Two entered the U.S. Sixth Fleet's area of responsibility.  On 27 February 2014, the group transited the Straits of Gibraltar and entered the Mediterranean Sea. During its transit across the Mediterranean, the strike group encountered and monitored a Russian naval task group led by the aircraft carrier Kuznetsov.  Carrier Strike Group Two entered the Suez Canal on 18 March 2014, exiting the Mediterranean Sea.
Crimean Crisis
With the Crimean crisis unfolding, on 6 March 2014, the guided-missile destroyer Truxtun (pictured) departed Souda Bay, Greece, for operations in the Black Sea with units of the Romanian and Bulgarian navies.  The official U.S. Navy news release noted that "Truxtuns operations in the Black Sea were scheduled well in advance of her departure from the United States." The U.S. Department of Defense also announced that Carrier Strike Group Two's deployment to the U.S. Fifth Fleet would be temporarily delayed, and the carrier group held in the Mediterranean Sea because of the ongoing crisis in the Crimea.
Morning Glory Incident
In the early morning hours of 17 March 2014, a team of United States Navy SEALs team operating from the USS Roosevelt successfully retook the hijacked North Korean-flagged oil tanker Morning Glory from Libyan terrorists while steaming in international waters off the southeast coast of Cyprus.  The Morning Glory had been seized "earlier in the month" by an armed group in the Libyan port of As-Sidra.  The hijackers unsuccessfully attempted to sell the ship's oil cargo illegally on the black market, with the earnings going to their separatist group and not the Libyan interim central government's National Oil Corporation.

U.S. Fifth Fleet
On 19 March 2014, Carrier Strike Group Two transited the Suez Canal and joined the U.S. Fifth Fleet.  The destroyer Truxtun rejoined the carrier group after departing the Black Sea on 21 March 2014.  On 22 March 2014, Carrier Strike Group Two relieved Carrier Strike Group Ten in the Gulf of Aden (pictured). Operating in the North Arabian Sea, Carrier Air Wing Eight launched its first combat sorties in support of coalition forces in Afghanistan on 26 March 2014. In addition to close air mission in support of coalition ground forces, Carrier Strike Group Two launched air mission in conjunction with the Afghan run-off elections.

On 18 October 2014, Carrier Strike Group One relieved Carrier Strike Group Two in the Persian Gulf (pictured). As of that date, Carrier Strike Group Two and its embarked Carrier Air Wing Eight had amassed 32,611 flight hours, 12,548 total sorties, and 9,752 arrested landings on board the carrier George H.W. Bush. Carrier Strike Group Two depart the U.S. Fifth Fleet on 27 October 2014, concluding a seven-month-long deployment.
Iraqi-Syrian Crises
With the ISIL military invasion of Iraq intensifying, Carrier Strike Group Two entered the Persian Gulf on 14 June 2014. CVW-8 aircraft began flying combat air patrols over Iraq on 19 June 2014.

On 8 August 2014, Carrier Strike Group Two conducted air-strikes directed to stop the advancement of ISIS forces into Erbil. These air strikes marked the return of U.S. air combat forces to Iraq since the end of the U.S. military operations in 2011.  By 20 August 2014, the strike group had launched 30 airstrikes against ISIS targets although the majority of the sorties have been devoted to surveillance missions.

Beginning 22 September 2014, a multi-lateral air campaign attacked ISIL military positions in Syria.  The targets included training compounds, headquarters and command and control facilities, storage facilities, a finance center, as well as supply trucks and armed vehicles.  Prior to the launch of the air campaign, a total of 47 land-attack Tomahawk cruise missiles were fired against ISIL military targets from the destroyer  and the cruiser  (pictured) operating from international waters in the Red Sea and Persian Gulf.  These missile strikes also included Khorasan Group targets located west of Aleppo. Finally, F/A-18 Hornets and EA-6B Prowlers (pictured) from Carrier Air Wing 8 executed the majority of the third wave of airstrikes against ISIL positions in Raqqa, Dayr az Zawr, Abu Kamal, and Al Hasakah.

On 6 October 2014, the anti-ISIL air campaign entered its ninth week of operation in Iraq and its fourth week in Syria.  As of that date, units of Carrier Strike Group Two contributed 20 percent of the total munitions used at an overall cost of $62 million (USD).  Effective 15 October 2014, the United States Central Command officially designated the U.S.-led air campaign against ISIL in Iraq and Syria as Operation Inherent Resolve.  Carrier Strike Group Two concluded its final offensive operations against ISIL on 18 October 2014.

Homecoming and key accomplishments

Carrier Strike Group Two transited the Suez Canal on 27 October 2014.  Following port visits, the strike group transited the Strait of Gibraltar on 6 November 2014.  Carrier Strike Group Two concluded its nine-month-long deployment when it arrived in Norfolf, Virginia, on 15 November 2014. The strike group was preceded by the return of the destroyer Arleigh Burke from its eight-month-long independent deployment to the U.S. Fifth Fleet on 17 October 2014.

During its 2014 deployment, the strike group's aviation units flew 12,774 sorties for a total of 34,831 flight hours. This included 3,245 combat sorties with 18,333 combat flight hours flown. Aircraft delivered 232 precision guided bombs and fired more than 2,400 rounds of 20mm ammunition. The aircraft also made 10,003 catapult launches and arrested landings (traps).

Surface units of Carrier Strike Group Two were also active during this 2014 deployment.  The destroyer Truxtun  operated with the Romanian and Bulgarian navies while showing the flag in the Black Sea amid the ongoing Crimean crisis.  The destroyer Roosevelt served as the mother ship for the re-capture of the hijacked oil tanker Morning Glory from Libyan terrorists. Also, destroyer Arleigh Burke and the cruiser Philippine Sea launched 47 Tomahawk land attack cruise missiles against Syrian targets in support of Operation Inherent Resolve.

Finally, naval aviation history reached a milestone when the Northrop Grumman EA-6B Prowler (pictured) made its final overseas deployment with Carrier Strike Group Two, retiring after 42 years of operations with the United States Navy.

Forces, operations, and port visits
2014 deployment force composition

2014 deployment operations, exercises, and port visits

2015 operations
Between 10–18 February, the Bush was underway for Fleet Replacement Squadron carrier qualifications.

On 1 April 2015, the Bush departed Norfolk for a 10-day underway for carrier qualification (CQ) operations for members of the Carrier Strike Group Ten and Carrier Air Wing Seven in the Atlantic Ocean, returning on 11 April 2015.  During a subsequent underway period, between 24–25 April 2015, the Bush off-loaded its ammunition to the dry cargo ship  in preparation for the carrier's planned incremental availability (PIA) refit.  The Bush conducted a final carrier qualification operation between 6–9 May 2015.

On 16 June 2015, the carrier George H.W. Bush moored at Super Pier 5 at Norfolk Naval Shipyard in Portsmouth, Virginia, to begin a six-month Planned Incremental Availability (PIA) refit and upkeep period.  The cruiser Philippine Sea and the destroyers Truxtun and Roosevelt are also scheduled to undergo maintenance and refit during 2015.

2017 operations
In July/August 2017, after operations against Daesh/ISIS, it took part in Exercise Saxon Warrior 17, with command and control temporarily passed to the Royal Navy's Commander UK Carrier Strike Group (COMUKCSG) staff. This allowed COMUKCSG to prepare for future Royal Navy carrier operations.

See also
 History of the United States Navy
 List of United States Navy aircraft squadrons
 U.S. Carrier Group tactics

Notes
Footnotes

Citations

Sources

External links
 
 

Carrier Strike Groups
Carrier Strike Group Two
Military in Norfolk, Virginia
Military units and formations established in 2004